Wahpia is a genus of alga known from the Middle Cambrian Burgess Shale. 33 specimens of Wahpia are known from the Greater Phyllopod bed, where they comprise 0.06% of the community.

References

External links
 

Burgess Shale fossils
Red algae genera

Cambrian genus extinctions